László Jakabházy (born 14 November 1938) is a former Hungarian ice hockey player. He played for the Hungary men's national ice hockey team at the 1964 Winter Olympics in Innsbruck.

References

1938 births
Living people
Ferencvárosi TC (ice hockey) players
Hungarian ice hockey centres
Ice hockey players at the 1964 Winter Olympics
Olympic ice hockey players of Hungary
Ice hockey people from Budapest